The Chausie is a domestic breed of cat that was developed by breeding a few individuals from the non-domestic species jungle cat (Felis chaus) to a far greater number of domestic cats (Felis catus). The Chausie was first recognized as a domestic breed by The International Cat Association (TICA) in 1995. Within the domestic breeds, the Chausie is categorized as a non-domestic hybrid source breed. Because Chausies are mostly descended from domestic cats, by about the fourth generation they are fully fertile and completely domestic in temperament.

History 

The first hybrids of the jungle cat (Felis chaus) and the domestic cat (Felis silvestris catus) may have been born in Egypt several thousand years ago. The jungle cat is native to a vast region spanning Southeast Asia, India, and the Middle East. For the most part, it is an Asian species of wild cat that lives by rivers and lakes. But the species is found in one small area of North Africa: the Nile Delta. It is well known that the ancient Egyptians kept domestic cats as pets. Many domestic cat mummies have been found interred in Egyptian temples. What is not so well known is that one other species of cat was occasionally preserved after death via mummification; that was the jungle cat. F. chaus is not a timid species; they are known for moving into abandoned buildings and living as happily by irrigation canals as by wild rivers, provided that adequate prey and shrubbery for cover are available. Because domestic cats are likely to have frequently encountered jungle cats along the Nile and occasionally even within their owners' homes, it seems that hybrids of the two species were probably often born there.

A few people experimented with breeding F. chaus to F. s. catus in the late 1960s and 1970s. Their intention was to provide a sensible alternative to keeping non-domestic cats as pets. However, the Chausie breed did not truly begin until the 1990s, when a dedicated group of breeders named the breed "Chausie" (after Felis chaus) and developed a planned breeding program and goals. These breeders asked for and received registration status from TICA in 1995. The breed worked its way through the New Breed Class from May 2001 through April 2013, and became TICA's newest Championship breed on May 1, 2013. Chausies are now being bred in both North America and Europe. The breed has begun the new breed recognition process in the World Cat Federation (WCF).

Characteristics 

Currently, most authentic Chausies produced are late generation cats with fully domestic temperaments. Their TICA registration certificates will usually indicate that they are "C" generation or "SBT," which nearly always means they are four generations or more beyond the jungle cat (F. chaus). In cases where they are "A" or "B" generation, it is usually because they have been recently outcrossed to another domestic breed to improve specific cosmetic traits, but the cats are nonetheless more than four generations beyond the handful of nondomestic ancestors.

Although the official, permissible outcrosses for the Chausie breed during early breed development were the Abyssinian and the domestic shorthair (no recognizable breed), in practice any kind of purely domestic outcross could be used. TICA rules only dictated that cats must be a certain number of generations removed from the jungle cat ancestors and have three generations of registered Chausie ancestors to be eligible for competition at shows. Consequently, a variety of breeds, albeit usually lively outgoing breeds (see below), were used to develop the Chausie breed and continue to be used occasionally as outcrosses. This has given the breed a diverse and healthy genetic foundation.

Appearance

Body 
Chausies are bred to be medium to large in size, as compared to traditional domestic breeds. Most Chausies are a little smaller than a male Maine Coon, for example, but larger than a Siamese. Adult Chausie males typically weigh . Adult females are usually . However, because Chausies are built for running and jumping, they are long-bodied and leggy with medium boning. The torso is deep-chested with flat sides. The ears are broad, tall, and set high on the head, about two fingers apart. The cheekbones are striking—prominent, long, and angular—and the eyes are flattened on top and form a half oval below.

Coat colors and patterns 
The TICA Chausie breed standard allows three colors: solid black, black grizzled tabby, and black ( brown) ticked tabby. Because the Chausie breed is relatively new, Chausies are still frequently born that have a variety of other colors and patterns, and they make wonderful pets. However, only the three permissible colors are considered ideal. Only cats in the three permissible colors can be entered in new breed classes at cat shows, and only the three colors will be eligible eventually for championship classes. Gold or yellow eye color is preferred, though yellower and lighter shades of green are allowed.

Solid black Chausies may have faint tabby markings (called ghost markings) as kittens, but usually acquire a dense, even black pigmentation with maturity. Sometimes black grizzled tabby Chausies will appear indistinguishable from solid black Chausies when the amount of grizzling is minimal. Exposure to strong sunlight, as with most black cats, can cause black Chausies to lighten slightly and appear brownish.

Black grizzled tabbies are unique to the Chausie breed among domestic cats. The grizzled pattern comes from the jungle cat; it is never found in domestic cats unless they have F. chaus ancestors. The kittens are often born completely black, although occasionally they may have a bit of light colored fur on the chin or neck at birth. As the kittens get older, they begin to look more and more like tabbies. However, they are tabbies with black on black markings. That is, the background color is a sort of dark brownish black, and the markings, such as the mid-line stripe on the spine, are pure black. In addition, alternating bands of off-white appear on individual hairs in the background color. The bands are along the middle of each hair. The root of each hair is mousie gray, while the tip of each hair is black. The off-white banding or "ticking" usually appears first on the neck, chin, and belly, as well as the insides of the ears. Later, the grizzling will often extend up the sides from belly to almost the spine. In the most heavily grizzled cats, the grizzling extends over the back of the neck, on the face, and even on the legs and tail. Usually the grizzling is complete by age 3 years. The effect in the best cats is spectacular. Grizzling does have a wide range of expression, however, and some cats never have more than a few banded hairs in the ears or in one spot on the belly, occasionally not even that.

Black ticked tabby Chausies have black ticking, black stripes on the inside of the upper legs and to a lesser extent on the outside, black rings on the tail, a black tail tip, and black tabby markings around the eyes. They are also known as brown ticked tabbies because, although the markings are black, the background color is brownish. The background color can vary in hue across a large range. While Chausie breeders try to avoid producing the very reddish brown background color seen in the Abyssinian breed, they do produce everything else in the range. Background color may be reddish gold, it may be a light golden brown, warm beige, cold beige, and even a very cool light gray with just a hint of brown in it. The latter is a very wild looking background color. Random polygenes influence the background color. Every time a black ticked tabby kitten is born, breeders start guessing what the background color will be, but it cannot be known for certain until the cat ages.

Behavior 
Because breeders outcrossed the foundation jungle cats to mostly intelligent, outgoing breeds such as the Abyssinian and Oriental Shorthair, Chausies are intelligent, active, athletic cats. They are often very "busy" as kittens. As adults, they are quieter, but they still retain a playfulness and lifelong curiosity. Chausies do not like to be alone; they need to have other cats as companions or have human company most of the time. Chausies get along well with dogs, too, and will do fine if raised with a canine in the house. Additionally, Chausies form deep bonds with people. They are loyal, and may have difficulty adjusting if re-homed as adults.

As with all non-domestic hybrid source breeds, some Chausies may inherit intestinal tracts similar to that of the non-domestic ancestors. The intestinal tract may be a little shorter than that of the traditional over elongateded domestic cat's. A shorter intestinal tract is known to be  incapable of processing ingredients derived from plants. That would include any kind of cereals, as well as vegetables, herbs, and spices. Those ingredients will serve as triggers for chronic intestinal inflammation and eventually lead to chronic inflammatory bowel disease that is perpetuated by multiple allergies to low quality, incomplete proteins in commercial cat food. Regardless of the cause, Chausies do seem somewhat prone to developing food allergies. To prevent this, breeders advise Chausie owners to feed only very high quality cat foods, containing as little of plant-derived ingredients as possible, or a homemade diet. If homemade diets are fed, it should be with the guidance of someone experienced in preparing them, because meat by itself does not contain all the nutrients that Chausies require.

See also 

Bengal cat
Savannah cat
Serengeti cat

References

Notes
Bird, C. "The Chausie: The Cat That Came Up From the Reeds." In: TICA Trend. Harlingen, TX: The International Cat Association, Inc., Dec. 2009/Jan. 2010, Vol. 31 No. 1.

Cat breeds
Domestic–wild hybrid cats
Experimental cat breeds